The Sauer Castle is an Italianate home at 935 Shawnee Road in Kansas City, Kansas, built from 1871 to 1873. It was designed by famed architect Asa Beebe Cross. It was the residence of Anton Sauer. He had married his wife Francesca in Vienna, Austria at age eighteen and a half. There, they had their five children: Gustave O.L., Anthony Philip Jr., Julius J., Emil, and Johanna. It is listed on the National Register of Historic Places.

Family background
In 1858,  decided to move to New York City to be with Anton's mother and sisters that had already been there for some time. Due to his worsening case of tuberculosis and Francesca's death in 1868, he decided to move his family to Kansas City.

After  business became successful, he began courting a young 28-year-old widow, Mary (Maria) Einhellig Messerschmidt, who had two daughters of her own: Anna and Maria. After marrying in 1869 they had five daughters (four survived to maturity): Eva Marie, Antoinette, Josephine (sometimes listed as Fosefa), and Clara. Daughter Helen (sometimes listed as Frances) died in infancy age 14 months.

By 1872 the mansion was finally fully furnished, sitting on the Shawnee Indian trail that was part of the old Santa Fe Trail that many wagons passed.

After Anton's death on August 16, 1879, in the second floor master bedroom, Mary and the children continued living in the house, as did the children continue living there after Mary's death in 1919. On November 29, 1919, she passed in Kansas City, MO of a heart attack.

Daughter Eve Maria Sauer married William C. Van Fossen in the house, having one child named Helen before the marriage failed 18 months into it. She then married a widower with six children of his own, local Wyandotte County businessman and landowner, Mr. John S. Perkins. Together they had three children and stayed married until he committed suicide with a handgun at age 73, due to his declining health. Eve and John S. Perkins's son John Harrison Perkins had an infant daughter drown in the swimming pool on the west side of the house. Eve continued to live in the family home with her son and two daughters, Eva Marie Perkins, and Marguerite A. Perkins, until her death in 1955.

Five generations of the Sauer family continued living in the mansion until the owner of a home heating oil company, Paul Berry, bought the house after Eve's death. He lived in the mansion until his own death in December 1986. Because of ghost stories originating in 1930, the house was constantly trespassed and vandalized, which Barry and his dog fought off themselves.

Subsequent history 
In January 1987, Bud Wyman, his son and daughter in law, Cliff and Cindy Jones, bought the home hoping to turn it into a bed and breakfast. At this time, no one lived in the house. In 1988, Carl Lopp, the great, great grandson of Anthony Sauer, bought the house with the intention of fixing it up and residing there to keep it in the family. However, this difficult task has only yielded minor improvements such as fixing balconies and putting a large fence around the property.

Carl Lopp's hired caretaker of the house was charged with felony theft on August 15, 1996, for stealing $30,000 worth of artifacts from the house, including a tractor, dress, chandelier, copper from the furnace, and wall sconces.

There have been several ghost stories based on tales that can be disproved (such as the previous family all being murdered there by the father, who then committed suicide) that attract vandals, which prevents Lopp from receiving insurance money.

In January 2022, he listed the property for $10 million, considered far above its true market value.

Architecture 
Architect Asa Beebe Cross designed it as an example of Italianate architecture. It was placed in the Register of Historic Kansas Places on July 1, 1977. It was placed in the National Register of Historic Places on August 2, 1977. It was placed in the Kansas City, Kansas Historic Landmarks on January 29, 1987.

References

Houses on the National Register of Historic Places in Kansas
Buildings and structures in Kansas City, Kansas
Houses in Wyandotte County, Kansas
National Register of Historic Places in Kansas City, Kansas
Italianate architecture in Kansas
Houses completed in 1871